Harry Lancaster (February 14, 1911 - February 5, 1985) was an American college sports coach and administrator.  He was an assistant men's basketball coach at Kentucky for more than 20 seasons under Adolph Rupp.  He was also Kentucky's head baseball coach in 1947 and from 1951 to 1965.  Lancaster attended Georgetown College in Kentucky, where he played basketball and baseball.

In addition to coaching, Lancaster worked as an instructor and administrator. He was a physical education professor at Kentucky from 1941 to 1975 and Kentucky's athletic director from 1969 to 1975.

Lancaster died on February 5, 1985, at age 73. He had liver cancer and diabetes.

Coaching career

Basketball
Lancaster was an assistant to Adolph Rupp for 22 years, hired to replace Paul McBrayer when McBrayer took the head coaching job at Eastern Kentucky.  He was at Rupp's side for UK's first four NCAA Championships (1948, 1949, 1951, 1958) and "Rupp's Runts" of 1966, that finished NCAA Runner-Up.

Baseball
Lancaster served as Kentucky's head baseball coach for 16 seasons over two stints (1947, 1951–1965).  He had an overall record of 163-164-1.  Through 1958, the Wildcats had only one winning season under Lancaster, when they went 8-7 in 1952.  From 1959 to 1965, however, the team did not finish below .500 and won more than 15 games four times.  It finished as high as second in the SEC East, in 1961.

From 1962 to 1964, future Major League Baseball player Cotton Nash played at Kentucky under Lancaster.  Lancaster's final season, 1965, was the first year of the Major League Baseball Draft. The Houston Astros selected Kentucky's James Monin in the 3rd round.

Legacy
The Lancaster Aquatic Center at the University of Kentucky, the home of the Wildcat's swimming and diving teams, is named for Lancaster.

Head coaching record
Below is a table of Lancaster's yearly records as a collegiate head baseball coach.

References

1911 births
1985 deaths
American men's basketball players
Basketball coaches from Kentucky
Basketball players from Kentucky
Georgetown Tigers baseball players
Georgetown Tigers men's basketball players
Kentucky Wildcats athletic directors
Kentucky Wildcats baseball coaches
Kentucky Wildcats men's basketball coaches